The 1988 New York Mets season was the 27th regular season for the Mets. They went 100–60 and finished first in the NL East. They were managed by Davey Johnson. They played home games at Shea Stadium.

The Mets would go on to lose to the eventual World Series champion Los Angeles Dodgers in the NLCS in seven games.

Offseason
 December 11, 1987: Jesse Orosco was traded as part of a 3-team trade by the Mets to the Los Angeles Dodgers. The Dodgers sent Jack Savage to the Mets, and the Oakland Athletics sent Kevin Tapani and Wally Whitehurst to the Mets. The Dodgers sent Bob Welch and Matt Young to the Athletics, and the Athletics sent Alfredo Griffin and Jay Howell to the Dodgers.
 December 11, 1987: Rafael Santana and Victor Garcia (minors) were traded by the Mets to the New York Yankees for Darren Reed, Phil Lombardi, and Steve Frey.
 March 26, 1988: Randy Milligan and Scott Henion (minors) were traded by the Mets to the Pittsburgh Pirates for Mackey Sasser and Tim Drummond.

Regular season
August 9: The Mets participated in the first official night game at Wrigley Field, which the Cubs won, 6–4.

Season standings

Record vs. opponents

Notable transactions
 August 4, 1988: Tom McCarthy and Steve Springer were traded by the Mets to the Chicago White Sox for Mike Maksudian and Vince Harris (minors).
 August 22, 1988: Héctor Ramírez was signed as an amateur free agent by the Mets.

Roster

Game log

Regular season

|- style="background:#cfc;"
| 1 || April 4 || 3:25pm EDT || @ Expos || W 10–6 || || || || || 55,413 || 1–0 || W1 ||
|- style="background:#fcc;"
| 2 || April 6 || 7:35pm EDT || @ Expos || L 1–5 || || || || || 11,112 || 1–1 || L1 ||
|- style="background:#cfc;"
| 3 || April 7 || 7:35pm EDT || @ Expos || W 8–5 || || || || || 10,193 || 2–1 || W1 ||
|- style="background:#fcc;"
| 4 || April 8 || 7:35pm EDT || @ Phillies || L 1–5 || || || || || 21,921 || 2–2 || L1 ||
|- style="background:#fcc;"
| 5 || April 9 || 3:20pm EDT || @ Phillies || L 3–9 || || || || || 30,994 || 2–3 || L2 ||
|- style="background:#cfc;"
| 6 || April 10 || 1:35pm EDT || @ Phillies || W 4–3 || || || || || 51,781 || 3–3 || W1 ||
|- style="background:#cfc;"
| 7 || April 12 || 1:35pm EDT || Expos || W 3–0 || || || || || 48,719 || 4–3 || W2 ||
|- style="background:#cfc;"
| 8 || April 14 || 1:40pm EDT || Expos || W 1–0 || || || || || 19,612 || 5–3 || W3 ||
|- style="background:#cfc;"
| 9 || April 15 || 7:35pm EDT || Cardinals || W 3–0  || || || || || 33,094 || 6–3 || W4 ||
|- style="background:#cfc;"
| 10 || April 16 || 1:30pm EDT || Cardinals || W 6–4 || || || || || 40,582 || 7–3 || W5 ||
|- style="background:#cfc;"
| 11 || April 17 || 1:35pm EDT || Cardinals || W 3–2 || || || || || 48,760 || 8–3 || W6 ||
|- style="background:#fcc;"
| 12 || April 18 || 7:50pm EDT || Phillies || L 7–10 || || || || || 14,931 || 8–4 || L1 ||
|- style="background:#fcc;"
| 13 || April 19 || 7:37pm EDT || Phillies || L 2–10 || || || || || 24,555 || 8–5 || L2 ||
|- style="background:#cfc;"
| 14 || April 20 || 7:41pm EDT || Phillies || W 6–2 || || || || || 27,714 || 9–5 || W1 ||
|- style="background:#cfc;"
| 15 || April 22 || 8:35pm EDT || @ Cardinals || W 4–0 || || || || || 47,207 || 10–5 || W2 ||
|- style="background:#cfc;"
| 16 || April 23 || 8:05pm EDT || @ Cardinals || W 12–9 || || || || || 45,110 || 11–5 || W3 ||
|- style="background:#fcc;"
| 17 || April 24 || 2:15pm EDT || @ Cardinals || L 4–5 || || || || || 41,617 || 11–6 || L1 ||
|-

|-

|-

|-

|-

|-

|-

|- style="text-align:center;"
| Legend:       = Win       = Loss       = PostponementBold = Mets team member

Postseason Game log

|-

|- style="text-align:center;"
| Legend:       = Win       = Loss       = PostponementBold = Mets team member

Player stats

Batting

Starters by position
Note: Pos = Position; G = Games played; AB = At bats; H = Hits; Avg. = Batting average; HR = Home runs; RBI = Runs batted in

Other batters
Note: G = Games played; AB = At bats; H = Hits; Avg. = Batting average; HR = Home runs; RBI = Runs batted in

Starting pitchers
Note: G = Games pitched; IP = Innings pitched; W = Wins; L = Losses; ERA = Earned run average; SO = Strikeouts

Other pitchers
Note: G = Games pitched; IP = Innings pitched; W = Wins; L = Losses; ERA = Earned run average; SO = Strikeouts

Relief pitchers
Note: G = Games pitched; W = Wins; L = Losses; SV = Saves; ERA = Earned run average; SO = Strikeouts

NLCS

Game 1
October 4: Dodger Stadium, Los Angeles

Game 2
October 5: Dodger Stadium, Los Angeles

Game 3
October 8: Shea Stadium, Flushing, New York

Game 4
October 9: Shea Stadium, Flushing, New York

Game 5
October 10: Shea Stadium, Flushing, New York

Game 6
October 11: Dodger Stadium, Los Angeles

Game 7
October 12: Dodger Stadium, Los Angeles

Awards and honors
 Keith Hernandez, Gold Glove Award
 Keith Hernandez, Major League record, most Gold Gloves by a first baseman (it was also his 11th consecutive Gold Glove)
 Kevin McReynolds – Player of the Month, September 1988
 Gary Carter – 300 career home runs, and set record for career putouts for a catcher
1988 MLB All-Star Game
 Gary Carter
 David Cone
 Dwight Gooden
 Darryl Strawberry

Team leaders
 Games – Darryl Strawberry (153)
 At-bats – Kevin McReynolds (552)
 Home runs – Darryl Strawberry (39)
 Runs batted in – Darryl Strawberry (101)
 Batting average – Wally Backman (.303)
 Hits – Kevin McReynolds (159)
 Doubles – Kevin McReynolds (30)
 Triples – Mookie Wilson (5)
 Walks – Howard Johnson (86)
 Stolen bases – Len Dykstra (30)
 Wins – David Cone (20)

Farm system

LEAGUE CHAMPIONS: St. Lucie, Kingsport

References

External links
1988 New York Mets at Baseball Almanac
1988 New York Mets at Baseball Reference
1988 New York Mets schedule and stats at MLB.com
The 1988 New York Mets at Retrosheet

New York Mets seasons
New York Mets
National League East champion seasons
1980s in Queens